Luciano Cipriani (born 8 March 1981 in Córdoba, Argentina) is an Argentine former professional footballer who played as a forward.

Clubs
 Belgrano de Córdoba 2002–2003
 Central Norte 2004–2005
 Luján de Cuyo 2005–2006
 Independiente Rivadavia 2006–2007
 Nocerina 2007
 Gimnasia y Esgrima de Mendoza 2008
 Defensores de Belgrano 2008–2009
 Santiago Wanderers 2009
 Deportivo Merlo 2010
 Sarmiento de Junín 2010
 Estudiantes de Buenos Aires 2011

References
 

1981 births
Living people
Argentine footballers
Association football forwards
Club Atlético Belgrano footballers
Independiente Rivadavia footballers
Estudiantes de Buenos Aires footballers
Gimnasia y Esgrima de Mendoza footballers
Santiago Wanderers footballers
Argentine expatriate footballers
Argentine expatriate sportspeople in Chile
Expatriate footballers in Chile
Argentine expatriate sportspeople in Italy
Expatriate footballers in Italy
Footballers from Córdoba, Argentina